Sir Lambert Blackwell, 1st Baronet (died 1727) of Sprowston Hall, Norfolk, was an English diplomat and Whig politician who sat in the House of Commons from 1708 to 1710.

Blackwell was one of the younger of the seventeen children of Captain John Blackwell, of Mortlake,  Surrey and his wife Elizabeth Smithsby, daughter of James Smithsby. His father was an active Parliamentary officer from 1650 to 1658, and in 1688 was Governor of Pennsylvania. In 1697, Blackwell was made Knight Harbinger and  Gentleman of the Privy Council, being Knighted on 18 May 1697. He married  before February 1698  Elizabeth Herne, second daughter of Sir Joseph Herne, of London, Merchant, and his wife Elizabeth Frederick, daughter of Sir John Frederick, Lord Mayor of London from 1661 to 1662.

From 1697 to 1705 Blackwell was British Ambassador to the Grand Duchy of Tuscany and from 1697 to 1698 and from 1702 to 1705 he was British Ambassador to the Republic of Genoa. He was appointed as British Ambassador to the Republic of Venice in 1702.

At the 1708 British general election Blackwell was returned as Whig Member of Parliament for Wilton. He did not stand at the 1710 British general election but was useful to the Whigs as a financier. In the year 1710 to 1711,  with a partner, he  advanced  £60,000 to the crown, and after the succession of George I he helped raise international loans. In 1715 he became a  Governor  of the South Sea Company in which he invested £13,000. He was created a baronet on  16 July 1718. He bought extensive property in the East of Norfolk and  became liable to sequestration under the 1721 South Sea Sufferers’ Act.

Blackwell died on 27 October 1727. His widow died on 12 October 1729.

References

1727 deaths
Ambassadors of Great Britain to the Republic of Venice
Ambassadors to the Republic of Genoa
Ambassadors to the Grand Duchy of Tuscany
Baronets in the Baronetage of Great Britain
Year of birth missing
18th-century diplomats
17th-century English diplomats